Telenueve is an Argentine TV news program. It is aired by Canal 9 since 2002.

Fortnite controversy 
In March 2019, following the Christchurch bombing, journalists claimed that the shooter was inspired by the Epic Games video game, Fortnite.

After talking about alleged stories related to the game, they pretended to play it with console controllers while playing a Fortnite gameplay taken from YouTube.

The public did not agree with what was done and accused the program of manipulation. Later, journalists admitted that it was a performance.

References

2002 establishments in Argentina
El Nueve original programming
Television news in Argentina
2002 Argentine television series debuts
2000s Argentine television series
2010s Argentine television series